A Daim bar is a Swedish-Norwegian chocolate bar made from crunchy almond caramel covered in milk chocolate.

History
Daim was created by Marabou in Sweden in the 1950s. Marabou originally wanted to produce a version of the American Heath Co.'s bar; its vice president Lars Anderfelt inquired about licensing Heath's exact recipe. The Heath Co. refused but gave Anderfeldt a list of their ingredients. From this, Marabou created their own recipe, testing it in Stockholm in 1952 with great success. It was launched under the name Dajm throughout Sweden and Norway the next year, Finland in 1963, and Denmark in 1971. It was renamed "Daim" in most countries in 1990, although it continued to be marketed in the United Kingdom and Ireland as Dime. The brand was purchased by the American company Kraft Foods in 1993 and is now held by Mondelez International, which Kraft spun off in 2012.

A famous 1995 television commercial (directed by John Lloyd) for the chocolate bar in the United Kingdom featured the comedian Harry Enfield, in which a salesman describes the Dime bar as "smooth on the outside, crunchy on the inside", while a customer says he prefers armadillos, which are "smooth on the inside, crunchy on the outside." Another successful commercial campaign was launched in 1996, and featured a spoof of Raiders of the Lost Ark. An unnamed adventurer uses a Daim bar to avoid triggering a death trap in an ancient temple, only to then return for the chocolate bar and take his chances with the crumbling structure. In 2005, the spelling in the UK and Ireland was changed to "Daim", in line with the rest of the world.

In 2007, a 'Limited Edition Cappucino' Daim bar was released. A limited edition forest fruit bar has also been released, as well as Coke Daim, white chocolate Daim, dark chocolate Daim, blueberry Daim, lemon-orange Daim and mint Daim. and orange chocolate Daim was sold in UK and Ireland this winter.  Daim bars imported from Sweden (manufactured in Upplands Väsby) have been sold in many countries.

Since the early 2000s, McDonald's McFlurry is available with Daim in France.

References

External links
Daim bar at Marabou's website 

Swedish confectionery
Chocolate bars
Mondelez International brands
Almond dishes
Products introduced in 1953